Swedish or  may refer to:

Anything from or related to Sweden, a country in Northern Europe. Or, specifically:
 Swedish language, a North Germanic language spoken primarily in Sweden and Finland
 Swedish alphabet, the official alphabet used by the Swedish language
 Swedish people or Swedes, persons with a Swedish ancestral or ethnic identity
 A national or citizen of Sweden, see demographics of Sweden
 Culture of Sweden
 Swedish cuisine

See also
 
 Swedish Church (disambiguation)
 Swedish Institute (disambiguation)
 Swedish invasion (disambiguation)
 Swedish Open (disambiguation)

Language and nationality disambiguation pages